Upper Basildon is a small village in the civil parish of Basildon (where the United Kingdom 2011 Census population is included),  near to Pangbourne, in the English county of Berkshire. It has a church, dedicated to St. Stephen, built in  1964 in the shape of the Christian secret symbol of a fish. Basildon Church of England Primary School is located in School Lane.

References

External links

Village Website for Upper and Lower Basildon

Villages in Berkshire
West Berkshire District